Craig Newbold (born July 31, 1948) is a former Republican member of the Ohio House of Representatives for the 1st district, serving one term from 2011 to 2013.

Life and career
A native of East Liverpool, Ohio, he later went forth to become an executive in the software development industry, where he ultimately started a business in Seattle, Washington.  Following his retirement from this industry, he opted to return to his native Columbiana County, Ohio.

Newbold later went forth to establish a not-for-profit information technology training program which allows individuals to develop specific skills in the industry.

Ohio House of Representatives
In 2010, Newbold opted to run against Representative Linda Bolon who was opting to take her third term in the Ohio House of Representatives.  While Bolon was initially strongly favored and not expected to face significant opposition, Newbold began to gain ground, notably due to a strong anti-incumbent sentiment.  In an upset, he would go on to win the election, with 52.58% of the electorate.

On January 3, 2011, Newbold was sworn into his first term. He served on the committees of Commerce, Labor and Technology (as vice chair); Education; and Finance and Appropriations and the Higher Education Subcommittee.

In 2012, Newbold lost reelection to a second term to Nick Barborak, 51% to 49%.

References

External links
The Ohio House of Representatives: Representative Craig Newbold (R-Columbiana) official site
Craig Newbold for Ohio official campaign website

Republican Party members of the Ohio House of Representatives
Living people
1948 births
People from East Liverpool, Ohio
People from Columbiana, Ohio
21st-century American politicians